, sometimes romanized as Getter Robot Go and known in the United States as Venger Robo, is a Japanese mecha anime and manga series and the third entry in the Getter Robo franchise originally created by Go Nagai and Ken Ishikawa.

The anime was originally broadcast from February 11, 1991, to January 27, 1992, on TV Setouchi and TV Tokyo with a total of 50 episodes. Along with the TV series, a few manga versions were released. One of them was released in the US under the name Venger Robo and in Spain as Venger Robot Go. The anime and manga are unrelated, and while the anime is a remake of the original series, the manga is a sequel of the original manga. The international title given to the anime on Toei's website is Goldbang.

Anime

Anime plot

In the year 200X, Doctor Rando, a genius scientist gone mad, has broken the peace on the Earth by trying to conquer the world from his Polar base, using an army of his Metal Beasts, super robots developed by him to conquer the world and led by his genetically created officers. No regular weapons seem to work against the Metal Beasts. To combat him, Japan's Defense Agency requests the cooperation of NISAR, the Japan International Aerospace Corporation, which has developed a robot, the Getter Robo. Dr. Tachibana, the head of the Getter Robo project, is reluctant to use the robot for battle. Despite this, Getter Robo, piloted by Go Ichimonji (later joined by Sho Tachibana and Gai Daido), is able to defeat a Metal Beast with the sacrifice of Shinichi, the son of Dr. Tachibana. This prompts the improvement of Getter to make it a transforming machine piloted by three persons, capable of defeating the Metal Beasts and stopping Dr. Rando from conquering the world.

Episodes

Source(s)

Staff and production notes
Airtime: Monday, 18:30-19:00
Network: TV Setouchi, TV Tokyo
Production: TV Setouchi, BigWest, Toei Company
Animation studio: Toei Animation
Planning: Yoshimasa Onishi (BigWest), Kenji Yokoyama (Toei)
Planning cooperation: Dynamic Planning
Producer: Chiyo Okazaki (TV Setouchi), Tatsuya Yoshida (Toei)
Original work: Go Nagai, Ken Ishikawa
Music: Michiaki Watanabe
Chief animation director: Joji Oshima
Series director: Hiroki Shibata
Series composition: Hiroyuki Hoshiyama
Script: Hiroyuki Hoshiyama, Yukiyoshi Ohashi, Junki Takegami, Shoji Tonoike, Katsuhiko Chiba
Episode direction: Hiroki Shibata, Toru Yamada, Yoshikata Nitta, Masayuki Akechi, Takao Yoshizawa, Takenori Kawada
Animation supervisor: Joji Oshima, Yuji Hakamada, Takahiro Kagami, Keiichi Sato, Joji Kikuchi, Seiya Nakahira, Takashi Nashizawa, Satoru Minowa, Masahiko Okura
Art: Shinzo Ko, Kayoko Koitabashi, Masazumi Matsumiya, Ryu Tomamura
Source(s)

The anime is a remake of the original Getter Robot series with no real relationship with the previous anime or manga. Each episode features a different metal beast enemy, a similar format to the anime television series Mazinger Z. The design of the Getter Robot has some features reminiscent of Mazinger Z, such as a "Rocket Punch" attack. The series also marked the renewal of business relationships between Toei Animation and Go Nagai, which were interrupted by the conflict with Daiku Maryu Gaiking.

Theme songs
Opening 1:  (lyrics by Bun Onoe, composition by Daiji Okai, arrangement by Hiroshi Toyama & Daiji Okai, song by Hiroyuki Takami)
Ending 1: Grievous Rain (lyrics by Bun Onoe, composition by Daiji Okai, arrangement by Hiroshi Toyama, song by Hiroyuki Takami)
Opening 2:  (lyrics by Kang Jin-hwa, composition & arrangement by Michiaki Watanabe, song by Ichiro Mizuki, chorus by )
Ending 2:  (lyrics by Kang Jin-hwa, composition & arrangement by Michiaki Watanabe, song by Ichiro Mizuki)
Source(s)

Media

Home video
The series was released on Laserdisc by Toei Video. Toei also released the series on DVD:

Music
The opening and ending themes have been released as singles and have been compiled in albums of the artists who performed them. The soundtrack is available in two CDs, one of which was re-released years later,

The opening and ending themes are available in several compilation albums of the Getter Robot series.

Manga
Three manga versions were published with the release of the TV series. Both of these versions were published by Shogakukan.
 
Another version, written and illustrated by Ken Ishikawa under the supervision of Go Nagai, was published in the magazine Shōnen Captain, published by Tokuma Shoten, from February 1991 to May 1993. This version was originally compiled in 7 volumes, and later reprinted in other collections published by Daitosha (5 volumes) and Futabasha (3 volumes).

From this manga, the first stories were published in the United States by Viz Media in 1993 in 7 issues (not volumes) under the name Venger Robo.

Some of these numbers were also published in Spain by Planeta DeAgostini in 1995, under the name Venger Robot Go. In France, the series was published from 1999 to 2001 for a total of 5 volumes by Dynamic Vision. A volume of the series was also published in South Korea by  Seoul Cultural Publishers. In Italy, the series was published integrally as part of the Getter Saga series, which included all Getter Robot series in a single series of 12 volumes. There are a lot of major differences between Ken Ishikawa's version and the TV version. The whole plot is rewritten to match as the sequel to the last series, Getter Robo G as well as incorporating characters and storyline that would later be adapted in the OAVs Getter Robo Armageddon and Shin Getter Robo vs Neo Getter Robo. Another interesting thing is the debut of the iconic Shin Getter Robo in the Manga's 5th volume.

Manga plot
Leading this project is Hayato himself, who soon scouts and enlists three young pilots: Go Ichimonji, a young professional athlete, Sho Tachibana, the daughter of Prof. Tachibana (leader of the Getter-Go project) and a skilled sword-fighter, and Gai Daidou, a former Getter mechanic. Together, these three pilots use a new set of Getter Machines to form the super robot known as "Getter Robo Go", and begin a battle to stop Rando once and for all.

Manga exclusive characters

References

External links
Getter Robo Go Toei Animation official website 
Getter Robo Go  at The World of Go Nagai webpage.
Getter Robot Go (manga)  at D/visual.

1991 anime television series debuts
1991 manga
Children's manga
Futabasha manga
Getter Robo
Shogakukan manga
Shōnen manga
Super robot anime and manga
Tokuma Shoten manga
Toei Animation television
TV Tokyo original programming
Viz Media manga